Turks in Denmark, also referred to as Turkish Danes or Danish Turks refers to ethnic Turkish people living in Denmark. They currently form the largest ethnic minority group in the country; thus, the Turks are the second largest ethnic group in Denmark, after the ethnic Danish people. The majority of Danish Turks descend from the Republic of Turkey; however, there has also been significant Turkish migration from other post-Ottoman countries including ethnic Turkish communities which have come to Denmark from the Balkans (e.g. from Bulgaria, Bosnia and Herzegovina, Kosovo, North Macedonia and Romania), the island of Cyprus, and more recently Iraq and Syria.

History 
At the end of the 1950s Denmark required a high labour demand which triggered labour immigration mainly from Turkey and Yugoslavia; consequently, alongside the Turkish migrants from Turkey, there was also a substantial number of Balkan Turks (e.g. Romanian Turks, Bosnian Turks etc) who arrived in Denmark. More recently, Iraqi Turks and Syrian Turks have also migrated to Denmark since the European migrant crisis.

Demographics
In 2008, a report published by the Danish Broadcasting Corporation stated that there was 70,000 people of Turkish origin who were Muslims. Thus, the Turks were the largest Danish Muslim population and accounted for 35% of the 200,000 Muslims. In 2015 the Turkish Danish population was around 75,000.

The majority of Turkish Danish people descend from Turkey; however, some have also arrived from other post-Ottoman countries. For example, there was approximately 2,000 Turkish Iraqi immigrants in Denmark in 2010 (excluding descendants).

Culture

Language

Within the home environment the mother tongue is most dominant and children are expected to speak Turkish. However, Danish is spoken outside the home creating a bilingual identity.

Religion

The majority of Turks regard themselves as Muslims. They worship their religion mainly within their own Turkish community and are subdivided mainly by political or religious differences. The Diyanet supports mosque associations in Denmark and controls the majority of the religious organisations used by the community. The "Danish Turkish Islamic Foundation" is part of the Diyanet and is the largest Muslim organisation in Denmark. The Diyanet's major competing Islamic networks are the Millî Görüş as well as the Alevi association.

In 2008 a report published by the Danish Broadcasting Corporation estimated that the Danish Turks formed 70,000 out of a total of 200,000 Muslims in the country. Hence, one-third of the country's Muslims were of Turkish origin.

Notable people 

Yildiz Akdogan, politician
Hasan Al, boxer 
, football player 
, imam (Turkish Cypriot origin)
Türker Alici, contestant on Robinson Ekspeditionen 2018
, politician
Mehmet Ali Avci, film maker
Yasin Avcı, football player
Oğuz Han Aynaoğlu, football player
Büsra Barut, female football player
, politician 
Zahide Bayram, crowned Miss Denmark (1999)
Baris Balo Bicen, contestant on Robinson Ekspeditionen 2019
, football player
Seckin Cem, contestant on Robinson Ekspeditionen 2007
Dennis Ceylan, boxer
Ercan, finalist on the X Factor 2010
Buket Genc, contestant on Robinson Ekspeditionen 2013
, chief physician at Sjællands Universitetshospital, Køge
Gökcan Kaya, football player
, actor and rapper 
Sara Keçeci, handball player (Turkish father and Danish mother)
Erkan Kilic, contestant on Baren 2001 
Hasan Kuruçay, football player 
Emre Mor, football player (Turkish father and Turkish Macedonian mother)
Şaban Özdoğan, football player
Yusuf Öztürk, football player
, actress and voice actress
Alev Ebüzziya Siesbye, ceramic artist
Aral Simsir, football player
, businessman and former athlete (Turkish father and a Danish mother)
Fatih Şahin, contestant on Robinson Ekspeditionen 2007
Tülin Şahin, model and actress 
, actor, politician and CEO of the Danish-Turkish newspaper Haber
Ertuğrul Tekşen, football player
Mona Tougaard, fashion model (Turkish, Danish, Somali, and Ethiopian descent)
, rapper (Turkish and Italian origin)
, politician

See also 
Islam in Denmark
Denmark–Turkey relations
Turks in Europe
Turks in Finland  
Turks in Germany
Turks in Norway
Turks in Sweden

References

Bibliography 
 
 
 
 
.
 

Muslim communities in Europe
Middle Eastern diaspora in Denmark
Denmark
Denmark